Anixia atrospora is a species of fungus belonging to the Anixia genus. It was discovered 1927 by French mycologist Narcisse Théophile Patouillard.

References 

Agaricomycetes
Taxa named by Narcisse Théophile Patouillard
Fungi described in 1927